The Golden Time is a 1949 novel by the Canadian author Harold Standish. It tells the story of the McGibbon family of Chatham, Ontario as they struggle with various troubles, including alcoholism, domestic abuse, and their ultimate triumph as owners of a tobacco farm in the countryside near Chatham. The novel was first published by in Toronto by Macmillan in 1949, and was later reprinted in several paperback editions. Like other novels of the period by such contemporaries of Standish as Morley Callaghan and Hugh Garner, The Golden Time uses terse, straightforward prose reminiscent of social realist genre. As a significant departure from realism, however, the novel uses a number of time-shift sequences to emphasize the connections between the different generations of the McGibbon family. In this sense, the novel can be regarded as a precursor to such modernist Canadian novels as Sheila Watson's The Double Hook and Hugh MacLennan's The Watch That Ends the Night (both published in 1959).

The Golden Time was Standish's first novel. He published just one more novel, Blues for Loretta, in (1954) before giving up fiction to concentrate on poetry. In his biography of Standish, Douglas Scott quotes the legendary literary critic George Woodcock as saying that The Golden Time is "a work that makes one wish Standish had turned his pen to fiction more often."

References
 Scott, Douglas M. Harold Standish: A Life in Letters. Toronto: Ryerson, 1970.

1949 Canadian novels
Novels set in Ontario